Toulouges is a commune in the Pyrénées-Orientales department in southern France.

Geography
Toulouges is located between Thuir and Perpignan, in the canton of Perpignan-6 and in the arrondissement of Perpignan.

Toulouges borders the following municipalities: Perpignan, Canohès, Thuir, El Soler, and Baho.

History
Toulouges probably grew upon a Roman villa. It was first mentioned in 904 at the same time mentioning the church called Tulogias. Other names that are presumably Toulouges are Tologis (in a 937 document), Tulujes (1027), Tuluges (1030), Toluges (1119).

Toulouges hosted an ecumenical council known as the Council of Elge-Toulouges in 1027. It aimed to promote peace among the feudal lords of France by declaring the Truce of God, attempting to limit the days of the week and times of year that the nobility could engage in violence.

During the 14th and 15th centuries Toulouges grew rapidly. A wall and hospital were in existence. In 1628, however, part of the population was killed by a plague. Today, though, Toulouges is again growing rapidly.

Demography

See also
Communes of the Pyrénées-Orientales department

References

Communes of Pyrénées-Orientales